Attorney General Todd may refer to:

James Todd (lawyer) (1786–1863), Attorney General of Pennsylvania
Moses Hampton Todd (1845–1935), Attorney General of Pennsylvania